Harnahi is a village in Bihar, India under Aurangabad District.

References

Villages in Aurangabad district, Bihar